Niederwürschnitz is a municipality in the district Erzgebirgskreis, in Saxony, Germany.

Notable people linked to Niederwürschnitz
 Gerhard Harig, (1902-1966) physicist

References 

Erzgebirgskreis